Breaking or breakin' may refer to:

Arts
 Breakdancing (also breaking), an athletic style of street dance
 Breakin', a 1984 American breakdancing-themed musical film
 "Breakin, a twelfth-season episode of the American animated television series SpongeBob SquarePants
 Breaking (film), a 2022 American thriller drama film
 Sequence breaking, performing actions or obtaining items in video games out of the intended linear order

Music
 "Breakin (song), a single from The Music's album, Welcome to the North
 "Breakin'... There's No Stopping Us", a song by American music duo Ollie & Jerry
 "Breakin, the sixth song on The All-American Rejects' 2008 album When the World Comes Down
 Breaking (album), an album by American musician Brian Larsen
 "Breaking" (song), a song by American alternative rock band, Anberlin

Damage
 Breaking (martial arts), technique that is used in competition, demonstration and testing
 Fracture, the separation of an object or material into two or more pieces under the action of stress
 Ship breaking, a type of ship disposal involving the breaking up of ships

Other uses
 Breaking, a step of horse training where the animal is ridden for the first time
 Burglary (also breaking and entering), the act of entering an area without permission and with intent to commit a crime
 Vowel breaking, the sound change of a monophthong into a diphthong or triphthong

See also
 
 
 Brake (disambiguation)
 Break (disambiguation)
 Break in (disambiguation)
 Breakdown (disambiguation)
 Breaker (disambiguation)